Mau is a constituency of the Uttar Pradesh Legislative Assembly covering the city of Mau in the Mau district of Uttar Pradesh, India.

Mau is one of five assembly constituencies in the Ghosi Lok Sabha constituency. Since 2008, this assembly constituency is numbered 356 amongst 403 constituencies.

Election results

2022

17th Vidhan Sabha: 2017 General Elections

Members of Legislative Assembly

References

External links
 

Assembly constituencies of Uttar Pradesh
Mau